Giacomo Balla (18 July 1871 – 1 March 1958) was an Italian painter, art teacher and poet best known as a key proponent of Futurism. In his paintings he depicted light, movement and speed. He was concerned with expressing movement in his works, but unlike other leading futurists he was not interested in machines or violence with his works tending towards the witty and whimsical.

Biography
Giacomo Balla was born in Turin, in the Piedmont region of Italy. He was the son of a photographer and as a child studied music.

At age nine, after the death of his father, he gave up music and began working in a lithograph print shop. By age 20, his interest in visual art had developed to such a level that he decided to study painting at local academies, and several of his early works were shown at exhibitions. Following academic studies at the University of Turin, Balla moved to Rome in 1895, where he met and later married Elisa Marcucci. For several years he worked in Rome as an illustrator, caricaturist and portrait painter. In 1899, his work was exhibited at the Venice Biennale, and in the ensuing years his art was shown at major exhibitions in Rome and Venice, as well as in Munich, Berlin and Düsseldorf, at the Salon d'Automne in Paris, and at galleries in Rotterdam.

Around 1902, he taught Divisionist techniques to Umberto Boccioni and Gino Severini. Influenced by Filippo Tommaso Marinetti, Giacomo Balla adopted the Futurism style, creating a pictorial depiction of light, movement and speed. He was a signatory of the Futurist Manifesto in 1910. Typical for his new style of painting is Dynamism of a Dog on a Leash (1912) and his 1914 work Abstract Speed + Sound (Velocità astratta + rumore). In 1914, he began to design Futurist furniture, as well as so-called Futurist "antineutral" clothing. Balla also began working as a sculptor, creating, in 1915, the well-known work titled Boccioni's Fist, based on 'lines of force' (Linee di forza del pugno di Boccioni).

During World War I, Balla's studio became a meeting place for young artists.

In 1935, he was made a member of Rome's Accademia di San Luca.

In 1955, Balla participated in the documenta 1 in Kassel.

He died on 1 March 1958.

Notable works

Balla's 1909 painting The Street Light typifies his exploration of light, atmosphere, and motion.

Balla's most famous works, such as his 1912 Dynamism of a Dog on a Leash, aim to express movement – and thus the passage of time – through the medium of painting. One of Balla's main inspirations was the chronophotography of Étienne-Jules Marey.

Balla's 1912 The Hand of the Violinist depicts the frenetic motion of a musician playing, and draws on inspiration from Cubism and the photographic experiments of Marey and Eadweard Muybridge.

In his abstract 1912–1914 series Iridescent Interpenetration, Balla attempts to separate the experience of light from the perception of objects as such.

Abstract Speed + Sound (1913–14) is a study of speed symbolised by the automobile. Originally, it may have been part of a triptych.

Balla's 1914 series Mercury Passing Before the Sun depicts the November 17, 1914 transit of Mercury across the face of the Sun. Balla created at least a dozen versions and studies of this work.

Legacy
In 1987, some of his artworks were exhibited at documenta 8, an exhibition of modern art and contemporary art which takes place every five years in Kassel, Germany.

See also

Parade (ballet)

References

Further reading
 Maurizio Fagiolo Dell'Arco, Balla: The Futurist (1988)
 Vivien Greene (ed.): Italian Futurism 1909 - 1944. Reconstructing the Universe, Guggenheim Museum 2014, 
 Giovanni Lista, Balla, catalogue général de l’œuvre, vol. I, Edizioni della Galleria Fonte d’Abisso, Modène, 1982 ; vol. II, L’Age d’Homme, Lausanne, 1984
 Giovanni Lista,Le Futurisme : création et avant-garde, Éditions L’Amateur, Paris, 2001
 Giovanni Lista, Balla, la modernità futurista, Edizioni Skira, Milan, 2008
 Giovanni Lista, Giacomo Balla: futurismo e neofuturismo, Mudima, Milano, 2009.
 Giacomo Balla, Scritti futuristi'', raccolti e curati da Giovanni Lista, Abscondita, Milan, 2010.

External links

 Guide to Balla's paintings, at Artcyclopedia
 Abstract Speed + Sound'' by Giacomo Balla, Guggenheim Museum
 Giacomo Balla's Biography- Guggenheim Museum
 Article on Italian Futurism exhibition at the Guggenheim Museum

1871 births
1958 deaths
19th-century Italian composers
19th-century Italian painters
19th-century Italian male musicians
20th-century Italian composers
20th-century Italian painters
20th-century Italian male musicians
Abstract painters
Futurist composers
Balla 01
Italian fascists
Balla01
Balla 01
Italian male composers
Italian male painters
Modern painters
Artists from Turin
19th-century Italian male artists
20th-century Italian male artists